Pignus simoni is a species of jumping spider in the genus Pignus. It is native to South Africa.

References
 Wesolowska, W. (2000). New and little known species of jumping spiders from Zimbabwe (Araneae: Salticidae). Arnoldia Zimbabwe 10: 145-174.

Spiders described in 1903
Salticidae
Spiders of South Africa